Bill Nye (born 1955) is an American scientist known for his role in Bill Nye the Science Guy.

Bill Nye may also refer to:

 Edgar Wilson Nye (1850–1896), American journalist and humorist, also known as Bill Nye
 G. Raymond Nye (1889–1965), American silent film actor, also known as Bill Nye
 Bill Nye, fictional character in Bret Harte poem "The Heathen Chinee"

See also
 William Nye (disambiguation)
 Bill Nighy (born 1949), British actor
 Bill Nigh (disambiguation)
 Bill Knight (disambiguation)